Dalby Söderskog (literally Dalby South Forest) is a small national park in the province of Scania in southern Sweden, situated in the municipality of Lund, near Dalby. It was established in 1918, when it was thought to be a unique remnant of primeval forest. In fact, the area has previously been used for pasture. The ground contains much limestone and chalk, which makes the flora rich. In particular, there are many spring flowers. An earth bank of unknown origin, possibly the ruins of an ancient fort, surrounds parts of the park. The national park encompasses the southern part of Dalby hage, while the northern parts (Dalby Norreskog and Hästhagen) form a nature reserve.

References

External links 

Sweden's National Parks: Dalby Söderskog National Park Dalby Söderskog National Park] from the Swedish Environmental Protection Agency

National parks of Sweden
Scania
Protected areas established in 1918
1918 establishments in Sweden
Tourist attractions in Skåne County
Geography of Skåne County